The Northern Power Station, is a  fuel-oil burning power station built in Chunnakam, Jaffna District, in Sri Lanka. The power station was built after the Northern Power company won a Ceylon Electricity Board tender to urgently set up a power station in the region in response to the 1990s/2000s power crisis. During its operations, the power plant had faced a number of legal cases due to the alleged contamination of water resources in the region.

See also 
 Uthuru Janani Power Station
 List of power stations in Sri Lanka

References

External links 
 

Oil-fired power stations in Sri Lanka
Buildings and structures in Jaffna District